Julen Luís Arizmendi Martínez (born 5 July 1976) is a Spanish chess Grandmaster (GM) (2004), Spanish Chess Championship winner (2012).

Biography
In the 2000s Arizmendi was one of the leading Spanish chess players. He three times won medals in Spanish Chess Championships: gold (2012), silver (2008) and bronze (2013). Other chess tournament successes of Arizmendi include: shared 1st place in Biel (2002), won in Cullera (2004), shared 1st place in Benidorm (2009).

Arizmendi played for Spain in the Chess Olympiads:
 In 2002, at second reserve board in the 35th Chess Olympiad in Bled (+4, =5, -1),
 In 2004, at second reserve board in the 36th Chess Olympiad in Calvià (+3, =4, -2),
 In 2006, at fourth board in the 37th Chess Olympiad in Turin (+2, =4, -1).

Arizmendi played for Spain in the European Team Chess Championships:
 In 2001, at second board in the 13th European Team Chess Championship in León (+1, =6, -1),
 In 2011, at reserve board in the 18th European Team Chess Championship in Porto Carras (+2, =1, -2).

In 2004, he was awarded the FIDE Grandmaster (GM) title.

References

External links
 
 
 Julen Luis Arizmendi Martínez chess games at 365Chess.com

1976 births
Living people
Spanish chess players
Chess grandmasters
Chess Olympiad competitors